The Yubileynaya mine is one of the largest diamond mines in Russia and in the world. The mine is located in the north-eastern part of the country in the Sakha Republic., 20 kilometers from the settlement of Aykhal. The mine has estimated reserves of 170.6 million carats of diamonds and an annual production capacity of 3.6 million carats.

See also
Aykhal diamond mine

References 

Diamond mines in Russia
Diamond mines in the Soviet Union